Simone Soares (born March 26, 1977) is a Brazilian actress.

Career 

In television, started in 1998, Rede Record, when he acted in A História de Ester. Still made in the same station, in 1999 Tiro e Queda and Louca Paixão. After the actress went to SBT and participated alumnus Ô... Coitado. In 2002, he served in the novel Marisol.

In 2005, he moved to Rede Globo and entered into A Lua Me Disse. In 2006, he made Os Amadores. Then the novel O Profeta. In 2007, participated in the series Sob Nova Direção. Then came the novel Sete Pecados. In 2008, another series Casos e Acasos, Dicas de Um Sedutor and Guerra e Paz.

In 2009, participated in the miniseries Maysa - Quando Fala o Coração. Came later in the novel Malhação. Made after Aline. Then the novel Caras & Bocas. Written in 2010 Escrito nas Estrelas and in 2011 O Astro.

Personal life 
Simone was married to director Mário Meirelles and had a daughter, Luana.

Filmography

Television

Film
 2005 - Tempo Real (short film)
 2005 - Silêncio e Pecado (short film)
 2005 - Over the Hedge - Brazilian voice dubbing
 2009 - Xuxa em O Mistério de Feiurinha .... Sleeping Beauty
 2010 - Incômodo (short film)
 2011 - Assalto ao Banco Central ... Reporter

References

External links 

1977 births
Living people
People from Taubaté
Brazilian television actresses
Brazilian telenovela actresses
Brazilian film actresses
Brazilian stage actresses